The 2010–11 Iranian Futsal 1st Division will be divided into two phases, the regular season, played from 11 November 2010.

The league will also be composed of 16 teams divided into two divisions of 8 teams each, whose teams will be divided geographically. Teams will play only other teams in their own division, once at home and once away for a total of 14 matches each.

Teams

Group A

Group B

League standings

Group A

Group B

Results table

Group A

Group B

Play Off 
First leg to be played 4 March 2011; return leg to be played 10 March 2011

Misagh Promoted to the Super League.

First leg

Return leg

First leg to be played 3 March 2011; return leg to be played 9 March 2011

Sh. Saveh Promoted to the Super League.

First leg

Return leg

See also 
 2010–11 Iranian Futsal Super League
 2011 Iran Futsal's 2nd Division
 2010–11 Persian Gulf Cup
 2010–11 Azadegan League
 2010–11 Iran Football's 2nd Division
 2010–11 Iran Football's 3rd Division
 2010–11 Hazfi Cup
 Iranian Super Cup

External links 
   فوتسال نیوز 
  I.R. Iran Football Federation

Iran Futsal's 1st Division seasons
2010–11 in Iranian futsal leagues